Johan (Juho) Erik Laakso (4 October 1854 – 23 September 1915; original surname Forsell) was a Finnish tenant farmer and politician, born in Askola. He was a member of the Parliament of Finland from 1907 to 1908, representing the Social Democratic Party of Finland (SDP).

References

1854 births
1915 deaths
People from Askola
People from Uusimaa Province (Grand Duchy of Finland)
Social Democratic Party of Finland politicians
Members of the Parliament of Finland (1907–08)